Miinnehoma (1983 – July 2012) was an Irish bred and British trained Thoroughbred racehorse most famous for his victory in the 1994 Grand National at Aintree, ridden by Richard Dunwoody, trained by Martin Pipe and owned by Freddie Starr.

Miinnehoma also won the 1992 Sun Alliance Chase and finished third to Master Oats in the 1995 Cheltenham Gold Cup at the age of twelve. In the 1995 Grand National he was tailed off from a long way out before being pulled up before the 21st fence on the second circuit.

After retirement he spent the rest of his days at the stables of Martin Pipe until his death at the age of 29 in July 2012.

Grand National record

References

External links
Complete Racing Record
Miinnehoma Pedigree
Video of Miinnehoma Winning the 1994 Grand National

1983 racehorse births
2012 racehorse deaths
Racehorses bred in Ireland
Racehorses trained in Ireland
Racehorses trained in the United Kingdom
National Hunt racehorses
Grand National winners
Thoroughbred family 10-d